Najr is a village in Iyal Surayh District of 'Amran Governorate, Yemen. It is located just to the south of 'Amran, on a small hill at the lower end of the Wadi Khuzamir.

History 
There are pre-Islamic ruins at Najr. Robert T.O. Wilson identified Najr with the palace of al-Nujayr mentioned by the 10th-century author al-Hamdani as one of the famous structures of Yemen. Najr was used as a military base at the edge of the Bawn during the medieval period, and during the Rasulid era, it was used as a base for a siege against Thula.

References 

Populated places in 'Amran Governorate